Infobel is a Brussels, Belgium-based online international telephone directory. Launched in 1995 by Kapitol SA, Infobel was the first online telephone directory. As of 2014, Infobel had a database that contained over 140 million telephone numbers.

History
The root for what would later become Infobel began when Marc Wahba pitched the idea to create a CD-ROM-based telephone directory of Belgian telephone numbers to Belgacom. In early 1995 Belgacom ended the project and Wahba went to stay with his brother, Alain Wahba. Alain owned Kapitol Trading, a small import-export business that dealt with Belgian and American goods, with Michaël Wellner. The Wahbas decided to finish the telephone directory project and begin marketing and selling it through Kapitol Trading. Kapitol began selling the CD-ROM telephone directory—named Infobel–in April 1995. In response, Belgacom sued Kapitol. The case against Kapitol was dismissed on 19 July 1995.

Building on the success of the CD-ROM telephone directory and the dismissal of Belgacom’s lawsuit, Kapitol launched the Infobel website in late July 1995. Infobel was the first telephone directory website launched on the then-nascent Internet. Within a year, the directory covered over 50 countries. At launch, the majority of Infobel’s revenue came from advertising.

In 2000, Infobel partnered with Maporama SA, an online cartography company, to add to the Infobel site mapping features for its European telephone listings.

Following the 2001 dot-com bubble, Infobel restructured and pared down its offerings to a more traditional business model.(lesoir2004) Infobel now focused on its database and search engine technology and its main revenue driver was businesses who used the site to ensure to verify the authenticity of foreign customers.
	
Kapitol acquired the Belgian and Dutch activities of Scoot Europe, a subsidiary of Vivendi Universal, in 2002. Late that year, the New York Times reported that the Infobel website had telephone listings for more than 187 countries and was available in six languages.

In 2008, Kapitol partnered with Multiplied Media Corporation to incorporate Infobel’s directory data into MMC’s Poynt, an application that allowed users to find local businesses and entertainment.

Kapitol launched the Infobel mobile app in 2012.

Website and business model
Infobel allows users to search telephone directories for businesses and people in countries across North America, South America, Europe, Asia, Africa, Australia and the Pacific, and the Middle East. It also features business listings by category for multiple European countries. The site is available in 17 languages: Dutch, English, French, German, Italian, Danish, Spanish, Portuguese, Polish, Turkish, Bulgarian, Romanian, Hungarian, Russian, Finnish, Swedish and Norwegian.

Much of Infobel’s revenue comes from businesses and websites that use the company’s databases to improve their own services. These computers include GPS device manufacturers such as Garmin and Mio Technology; Bing; Yahoo!; Google Maps; Yelp; and the BlackBerry app Poynt.

External links
 Official Site

References

Companies based in Brussels
Companies established in 1995